The Rugby club Châteaurenard  is a French rugby union based in Châteaurenard. 
It's playing in the Fédérale 1, the third level of French rugby union.

History

The RC Châteaurenard, is one of the most ancient rugby club of his region, andborbn after the merging of Stade Châteaurenardais and ''Gallia' in 1945.  After a raising in their results, the clan arrive in second division championship in the 5o's (never relegated) reaching the first division (Groupe A) in 1993-94.

Palmarès 
 French Champion "Groupe B"  1991-1992
 French Champion "Groupe B"  and promoted to "Groupe A" in 1994-1995
 French Champion of "Nationale B", winner of "Coupe of l'Espérance"  (groupe B) 1996-1997
 French Champion  of Fédérale 1 (play-down) : 2007
 Vice-French Champion of "Nationale B", ("Groupe B") 1997-1998

Heritage

Famous Players 
 Michel Fabre  : French Champion with Béziers
 Michel Konieck  : former player and captain of the Perpignan
 Éric Piazza  : former French Champion with Béziers
 José Rakoto  :  fly-half of Madagascar national team
 Gheorghe Solomie   40 caps  with Romania
 Levan Tsabadze  : former captain of Georgia, and former player of Narbonne,  Castres and 'Clermont
 Bernard Viviès   : assistant coach of  France national rugby union team

Coaches 
 Roland Crancée  : 2 caps France in 1960-1961, French Champion with Lourdes in 1960.
 Gérald Boileau and Jean-Marc Pigeaud
 Arnaud Vercruysse and Sébastien Jolet

External links 
 Official Site

French rugby union clubs
Chateaurenard